2-Butyl-3-(p-tolyl)quinuclidine (BTQ) is a stimulant DRI. It is one of a number of substituted quinuclidine derivatives developed as potential medications for the treatment of cocaine abuse, and produces similar effects to cocaine in animal studies, although milder and longer-lasting.

See also 
 AL-1095

References 

2-Benzylpiperidines
Stimulants
Dopamine reuptake inhibitors
Quinuclidines